The Cathedral Quarter is one of Sheffield's eleven designated quarters, located around and named after the Cathedral. It is bound by Tenter Street to the Northwest, West Bar to the North, Snig Hill to the North east, Angel Street to the East, High Street and Church Street to the south and Townhead Street around its western corner.

The quarter is an office and retail location, containing the Church Street shops and is the regional centre of the former Midland Bank (now HSBC) in the Pennine Centre, on the South side of Tenter Street and also contains the St James' Tower.

Architecture

The area features the highest density of Georgian buildings anywhere in the city, with the picturesque Paradise Square sat in the heart of it.

Transport

The Cathedral Quarter is served by the Sheffield Supertram via the Cathedral stop on all lines. It also acts as the terminus of the City Link Tram Train to Rotherham.

External links
 Cathedral Quarter plan at Sheffield City Council

Sheffield City Centre (quarters)